The 1989–90 Quebec Nordiques season was the Nordiques 11th season in the National Hockey League.

Offseason
The Nordiques would not bring back Jean Perron, who finished the 1988–89 season as the interim head coach of the team.  Quebec would bring back former head coach Michel Bergeron, who had coached the club from 1980 to 1987.  Bergeron left the Nordiques to coach the New York Rangers from 1987 to 1989, leading them to two consecutive 82 point seasons.  The club also named Martin Madden as the new general manager.

At the 1989 NHL Entry Draft, the Nordiques had the first overall draft pick, and selected Mats Sundin from Nacka HK.  Sundin became the first ever European born player drafted with the first overall selection.  In 25 games with Nacka, Sundin had ten goals and 18 points.  With their second pick, Quebec drafted Adam Foote from the Sault Ste. Marie Greyhounds.  In 66 games, Foote had seven goals and 39 points in 1988–89.

Quebec made some trades during the off-season, dealing away their top goal scorer from the 1988–89 season, Walt Poddubny, along with a fourth round draft pick in the 1990 NHL Entry Draft to the New Jersey Devils for Joe Cirella, Claude Loiselle, and an eighth round draft pick in the 1990 NHL Entry Draft.  Cirella had three goals and 22 points in 80 games with the Devils in 1988–89, while Loiselle had seven goals and 21 points in 74 games.  Quebec also traded Bob Mason to the Washington Capitals for future considerations, and Gaetan Duchesne to the Minnesota North Stars for Kevin Kaminski.  Kaminski spent the 1988–89 with the Saskatoon Blades of the WHL, scoring 25 goals and 68 points in 52 games.  Right at the end of the pre-season, the Nordiques traded away Randy Moller to the New York Rangers for Michel Petit.  Petit had eight goals and 33 points with the Rangers in 1988–89.

The biggest move the club made was signing free agent Guy Lafleur to a two-year contract.  Lafleur, who originally retired during the 1984–85, was inducted into the Hockey Hall of Fame in 1988.  Lafleur came out of retirement and signed with the New York Rangers for the 1988–89 season, where he scored 18 goals and 45 points in 67 games with the Rangers.  Lafleur won five Stanley Cup championships with the Montreal Canadiens, and had a streak of 50 or more goals in a season and at least 119 points during a six-year stretch from 1974 to 1980.  Lafleur also scored a league high 60 goals in 1977–78, and led the league in scoring for three consecutive seasons, from 1975 to 1978.  The Nordiques also signed Lucien DeBlois, who also spent the previous season with the New York Rangers, where he had nine goals and 33 points in 73 games.

Regular season
Quebec would have a poor start to the season, going 1-4-1 in their first six games, before winning two in a row to be only a game under .500.  The Nordiques then lost eight games in a row to quickly fall out of the playoff race, before winning two in a row to improve to 5-12-1.  However, any hope of contention ended when they only won a total of four games in December and January.

As the losses piled up for the Nordiques, they began to make trades.  Greg Adams and Robert Picard were traded to the Detroit Red Wings for former Nordiques player Tony McKegney, while Jeff Brown was dealt to the St. Louis Blues for Tony Hrkac and Greg Millen.

By February 2, 1990, the Nordiques were 9-36-6, and their season was all but finished. On that date, the club fired general manager Martin Madden, and replaced him on an interim basis with former general manager Maurice Filion.  Under Filion, the Nordiques traded away Michel Goulet, Greg Millen and a sixth round draft pick in the 1991 NHL Entry Draft to the Chicago Blackhawks for Everett Sanipass, Mario Doyon, and Dan Vincelette.  The trades continued, as team captain Peter Stastny was traded to the New Jersey Devils for Craig Wolanin and future considerations, which turned out to be Randy Velischek.

None of the roster moves had much effect.  The Nordiques only won three more games for the remainder of the season to finish with a 12-61-7 record, earning 31 points—easily the worst record in the NHL.  The next-worst record belonged to the Vancouver Canucks, who finished with more than twice the Nordiques' point total. The twelve wins was the fewest by a team since the Winnipeg Jets had nine in 1980–81, while their 31 points was the fewest since the Washington Capitals had 21 in the 1974–75 season.  It is still the worst season in Nordiques/Avalanche history, and one of the worst for a non-expansion team since 1967.

Offensively, the Nordiques were led by Joe Sakic, who had 39 goals and 102 points, both team highs.  Peter Stastny was the only other Nordique to finish with more than 20 goals, as he had 24 goals and 62 points before being traded to the New Jersey Devils.  Tony McKegney had 16 goals and 27 points in 48 games after being acquired from the Detroit Red Wings, while Guy Lafleur had 12 goals and 34 points in his first season with the Nordiques.

On defense, Michel Petit put up twelve goals and 36 points in his first season with the club.  Rookie Bryan Fogarty had four goals and 14 points in 45 games, however, he had a -47 rating, the worst on the club.

In goal, Ron Tugnutt led the Nordiques with five wins, while posting a club best 4.61 GAA in 35 games.

The Nordiques finished the regular season last in scoring (240 goals for), last in goaltending (407 goals allowed), last in power-play goals allowed (98) and last in penalty-killing percentage (74.35%).

The Nordiques finished the 1989–90 regular season with a 5.05 GAA. They are the last team to finish the regular season with a GAA above five to date.

Final standings

Schedule and results

Player statistics

Transactions
The Nordiques were involved in the following transactions during the 1989–90 season.

Trades

Waivers

Free agents

Draft picks
Quebec's draft picks from the 1989 NHL Entry Draft which was held at the Met Center in Bloomington, Minnesota.

Farm teams
Halifax Citadels - AHL

See also
1989–90 NHL season

References

External links

Quebec Nordiques season, 1989-90
Quebec Nordiques seasons
Que